The Brady Street Cemetery is a historic Jewish cemetery on Brady Street in Whitechapel in the East End of London, E1. The cemetery opened in 1761 as the burial ground for the New Synagogue and was subsequently used by the Great Synagogue. It was closed to further burials from 1857. Several notable people are buried there.

Architecture

The London: East edition of the Pevsner Architectural Guides describes the cemetery as "crowded with mainly later Victorian monuments" and highlights Miriam Levy's monument for its "considerable lavishness".

History
The land the cemetery occupies was originally a brickfield on Ducking Pond Lane and was subsequently known as North Street. In 1761 it was leased to the New Synagogue for an annual rent of 12 guineas. The cemetery was extended in 1795.

The Brady Street Cemetery rapidly filled, and a solution was found with the addition of a four-foot layer of soil in the centre of the cemetery to allow additional burials. The raised area became known as the "Strangers Mound" as many of the new burials were not affiliated to any particular congregation. The headstones of the burials in the Strangers Mound and the ones below are set back to back. The Great Synagogue subsequently buried people in the New Synagogue's Jewish cemetery at West Ham after forming a Conjoint Burial Board with the New Synagogue.

In the 1980s the local council intended to redevelop the cemetery with the use of a compulsory purchase order as it had not been used for many years. If a cemetery has not had any interments for 100 years it may be redeveloped, but with the burial of Victor Rothschild, 3rd Baron Rothschild in the cemetery in 1990, the future of the Brady Street Cemetery was secured from building development until at least 2090.

The cemetery is owned by the United Synagogue and open only by appointment.

Notable burials
 Financiers Benjamin (c. 1753–1808) and Abraham (c. 1756–1810) Goldsmid, both of whom committed suicide
 Rabbi of Great Britain Solomon Hirschell (1762–1842)
 Hyman Hurwitz (1770–1844), the first professor of Hebrew at University College, London
 Charity worker Miriam Levy (1801–1850)
 Centenarian Nathan Moses who died aged 107 in 1799
 Banker Nathan Meyer Rothschild (1777–1836) and his wife Hannah Rothschild (née Barent-Cohen, 1783–1850)
 Business executive and intelligence operative Victor Rothschild, 3rd Baron Rothschild (1910–1990)
 Judah Cohen (1768–1838), merchant and owner of numerous slave plantations in Jamaica

See also
 Brady Street
 Jewish cemeteries in the London area

References

External links

 
  London Gardens Online: Brady Street Cemetery
 Complete photographic record of headstones at the Brady Street Cemetery at CemeteryScribes

1760s in London
1761 establishments in England
Ashkenazi Jewish culture in London
Buildings and structures in Whitechapel
Cemeteries in London
Jewish cemeteries in the United Kingdom
Jews and Judaism in London
Rothschild family